Operabase is an online global database for audiences and professionals. It lists details on opera performances, opera houses and companies, and performers as well as their agents. It was founded in 1996 by English software engineer and opera lover Mike Gibb. Initially a hobby site, it became his full-time occupation after three years. Opera magazine describes the Operabase website as "the most comprehensive source of data on operatic activity". Gibb sold Operabase to Truelinked in 2018. The company was then bought by Arts Consolidated (headquartered in Denmark) and relaunched in 2021. The management team is led by Ulrike Köstinger (Chief Executive Officer) and other members of the management team are Bharani Setlur (Chief Product Officer), Trine Guldmann (Chief Finance Officer) and Peter Palludan (Chief Technology Officer).

History

Early expansion 
By its tenth anniversary, in 2006, the site received "about 10,000 visitors a day to the public site, who look at over four million pages a month between them. Of these, fewer than half use English, 17% use German, 12% Italian, 10% French, 9% Spanish." In autumn of that year the British magazine Opera Now reported that "Operabase has taken on the Herculean task of making [the site] available to every European Union citizen in their own language – not only the 21 (as at January 2007) official languages of the EU, but Catalan, Icelandic and Norwegian as well." As of November 2012, the free public area of the site is available in 22 languages, and includes 37,000 performances, 40,000 artists, 700 opera companies, festivals and theatres, and the contact details and rosters of 400 artist managers.

Seven years after the public site was launched, a professional site followed and within three years, "200 opera houses from the Met to La Scala" were subscribers. The initial service offering for the 750 euro annual subscription fee had increased artist information and an opera casting tool. The casting tool was used for researching singers for a given role, but was particularly valued for finding replacement singers when there were emergency cancellations. The tool could not only put forward the names of all of the singers who had sung that role, but the artist schedules could be used to find if they were available, and the artists management and contact information could be used to make contact.

Recent developments 
In 2019, Arts Consolidated ApS, a Danish company specialising in performing arts, acquired Operabase. The relaunch of Operabase meant constructing a site as a Service-Orientated Architecture (SOA) that “provides a flexible interface that responds to the needs of individual users.”

Public website
The database is was operated by Gibb and Muriel Denzler. As has been noted by Gibb and Denzler in an article on the website of Opera Europa (the European opera service organisation similar to those which exist in the US and Canada, Opera America and Opera.ca) they provide specialised services to opera professionals, with the site including "casting tools, artist records, management details, productions information". But they emphasise that "the site was originally created for the general public, who still provide 96% of its users".

Operabase is now available in 34 languages and provides services to opera professionals for a fee, although the site is searchable by any web user at no charge.

Professional website
The professional services are available to companies, festivals, opera houses, theatres, orchestras, choruses, agencies, artists, academia and journalists. The site remains searchable by any web users at no charge.

Statistics

In autumn 2010, Operabase produced a set of statistics to mark the 250,000th performance on file. These statistics were presented at the third European Opera Forum, organised by Opera Europa in London in March 2011. In autumn 2013, the statistics were updated to show the 2012/13 season figures.

The Operabase rankings of the most performed operas formed the basis of a set of music questions in an edition of the BBC's University Challenge, broadcast in July 2014.  Competitors were asked to identify three operas in the Operabase list from sound clips of Maria Callas.

Most played composers

In the five seasons 2008/09 to 2012/13, 2415 different works from 1161 different composers were played. The most popular composers were:
 Giuseppe Verdi, with 2,586 performances of 28 operas
 Giacomo Puccini, with 1,893 performances of 12 operas
 Wolfgang Amadeus Mozart
 Richard Wagner
 Gioachino Rossini

More than 600 of the composers played in this period were still alive. The most frequently programmed of these were Philip Glass, Hans Werner Henze, and John Adams.  Kaija Saariaho was the most played female composer, living or dead.

Most popular operas

Throughout the 2015/16 season the most popular operas overall were:
La traviata (1853, Verdi) with 4190 performances over 869 runs
Die Zauberflöte (1791, Mozart) with 3310 performances over 561 runs
Carmen (1875, Bizet) with 3280 performances over 691 runs
La bohème (1896, Puccini) with 3131 performances over 672 runs
Tosca (1900, Puccini) with 2694 performances over 608 runs

The most popular operas by composers from the 20th century (i.e., by composers born after 1900) were The Turn of the Screw by Benjamin Britten and Lady Macbeth of the Mtsensk District (1934, Dmitri Shostakovich).  The most popular works by composers alive on 31 July 2012 were the monodrama The Diary of Anne Frank (composed 1968, Grigory Frid), and the opera Dead Man Walking (2000, Jake Heggie).

Most operatic places

In the 2015/16 season, the cities with the most opera performances were:
Moscow with 582 performances
Vienna with 535 performances
Berlin with 527 performances
London with 427 performances
St. Petersburg with 422 performances

References

External links 
 

British music websites
Online music and lyrics databases
Internet properties established in 1996
1996 establishments in England